The 1999 Cork Senior Hurling Championship was the 111th staging of the Cork Senior Hurling Championship since its establishment by the Cork County Board in 1887. The draw for the 1999 opening round fixtures took place on 11 December 1998. The championship began on 5 June 1999 and ended on 31 October 1999. It was the last championship to be played using a straight knock-out format.

Imokilly were the defending champions, however, they were defeated by University College Cork in the semi-final.

On 31 October 1999, Blackrock won the championship following a 3-17 to 0-8 defeat of University College Cork in the final. This was their 30th championship title and their first in 14 championship seasons.

University College Cork's Joe Deane was the championship's top scorer with 3-26.

Team changes

To Championship

Promoted from the Cork Intermediate Hurling Championship
 Castlelyons

Results

First round

Second round

Quarter-finals

Semi-finals

Final

Championship statistics

Top scorers

Top scorers overall

Top scorers in a single game

Miscellaneous
 Blackrock win the title for the first time in 14 years.
 University College Cork qualified for the final for the first time since 1970.
 University College Cork miss out on the double after the football team won the SFC.

References

Cork Senior Hurling Championship
Cork Senior Hurling Championship